The Mexico women's national cricket team, nicknamed the Jaguars (Las Jaguares), represents the country of Mexico in women's cricket matches.

In April 2018, the International Cricket Council (ICC) granted full Women's Twenty20 International (WT20I) status to all its members. Therefore, all Twenty20 matches played between Mexico women and another international side after 1 July 2018 were a full WT20I.

Mexico's first WT20I matches were contested as part of the South American Women's Championships in August 2018 against Brazil, Chile and Peru however Peru's matches were not classified as WT20Is as not all of their players met the ICC residency requirements. Mexico lost four matches and won two to finish third on the table.

Tournament history

South American Cricket Championship
 2018: Group Stage
 2019: Group Stage

Central American Cricket Championship
 2019: Winner

Records and Statistics 

International Match Summary — Mexico Women
 
Last updated 5 October 2019

Twenty20 International 

 Highest team total: 164/8 v. Costa Rica on 26 April 2019 at Las Cabellerizas, Naucalpan.
 Highest individual score: 52*, Caroline Owen v. Chile on 4 October 2019 at Lima Cricket and Football Club, Lima.
 Best individual bowling figures: 3/10, Tania Salcedo v. Costa Rica on 26 April 2019 at Las Cabellerizas, Naucalpan.

T20I record versus other nations

Records complete to WT20I #784. Last updated 5 October 2019.

See also
 List of Mexico women Twenty20 International cricketers

References

Further reading
 Mexico women's cricket team taps into grass roots to revive sport's dormant history

Women's
Women's national cricket teams
Cricket